Aureoboletus moravicus, commonly known as the tawny bolete, is a species of bolete fungus in the family Boletaceae that is found in Europe. Originally described as Boletus moravicus by Václav Vacek in 1946, it was transferred to the genus Aureoboletus by Wolfgang Klofac in 2010. It is an uncommon bolete of unknown edibility that appears as a vulnerable species on some European Red Lists, and is considered critically endangered in the Czech Republic. Preferred habitats include parklands, near oak trees.

References

Further reading

External links

moravicus
Fungi described in 1946
Fungi of Europe